SPIN (or South Pacific Island Network) was a submarine communications cable system that would connect the New Zealand to Tahiti and would connect several South Pacific islands along the way. It was planned to be in service late 2010. It would have cable landing points at:

 American Samoa
 Fiji
 New Caledonia
 New Zealand
 Norfolk Island
 Samoa
 Tahiti, French Polynesia
 Wallis and Futuna

Project Cancellation

The SPIN project failed to materialize due to a lack of funding.

Related networks
Gondwana-1 cable connects Australia to New Caledonia.
Honotua cable connects Tahiti to Hawaii.

Notes

Submarine communications cables in the Pacific Ocean